Frances Hodgson Burnett Memorial Fountain, located near Fifth Avenue and the Museum of the City of New York in Manhattan's Central Park, is an outdoor bronze sculpture and fountain which serves as a memorial to Burnett, the author of several literary classics including The Secret Garden and Little Lord Fauntleroy.

Description and history
Created by sculptor Bessie Potter Vonnoh in 1936 and dedicated on May 28, 1937, by Mayor Fiorello LaGuardia, it depicts Mary and Dickon from The Secret Garden.

References

External links

 Burnett Memorial Fountain by David Berger (November 23, 2009), CUNY

1936 establishments in New York City
1926 sculptures
Bronze sculptures in Central Park
Fountains in New York City
Monuments and memorials in Manhattan
Outdoor sculptures in Manhattan
Sculptures in Central Park
Sculptures of children in the United States
Statues in New York City
Statues of fictional characters